Maj Ernest Shipman U.S. Army Air Force (April 6, 1923 -  ) from Saginaw, Michigan was an American World War II Ace pilot who shot down seven aircraft in the Mediterranean theatre of World War II.

Career

On May 5, 1944, Shipman shot down his first enemy aircraft: an Italian Air Force Fiat G50 over Ploesti, Romania. On June 13, 1944, he shot down a Me-210 twin engine over Landshut, Austria. He shot down several more planes in June and July 1944, and reached Ace status on July 21, 1944, when he destroyed an Bf-109 over Budapest. Shipman was flying a P-51 when he was shot down on July 30, 1944,  Budapest by a P-38 and captured. He became a prisoner of was until the end of World War II.

After the war he earned a Bachelor's degree (1948) and Master's degree from Columbia College, New York (1950). Shipman stayed in service with the New York Air National Guard until he retired as a Major in 1957.

Awards

Air Force Longevity Service Award with 4 oak leaf clusters
Air Medal with 11 oak leaf clusters (2 silver, 1 bronze)
American Campaign Medal
American Defense Medal
Armed Forces Reserve Medal
Congressional Gold Medal (2015)
Distinguished Flying Cross
National Defense Service Medal
Prisoner of War Medal
Silver Star
World War II Victory Medal
Air Force Commendation Medal
European-African-Middle Eastern Campaign Medal with 4 bronze stars

See also
List of World War II aces from the United States
List of World War II flying aces

References

Further reading

Notes

1923 births
2004 deaths
United States Air Force officers
American World War II flying aces
Military personnel from New York (state)
United States Army Air Forces pilots of World War II
Recipients of the Distinguished Flying Cross (United States)
Recipients of the Silver Star
New York National Guard personnel